Dryopteris cristata is a species of fern native to wetlands throughout the Northern Hemisphere. It is known as crested wood fern or crested buckler-fern. This plant is a tetraploid species of hybrid origin, one parent being Dryopteris ludoviciana and the other being the unknown, apparently extinct species, dubbed Dryopteris semicristata, which is also one of the presumed parents of Dryopteris carthusiana. D. cristata in turn is one of the parents of Dryopteris clintoniana, another fern of hybrid origin.

The crested wood fern is a wetlands plant, needing year-round moisture.  The fronds often grow quite tall, up to a meter or more in height, but are extremely narrow under most conditions.

Anti-microbial properties
It is known that this plant has been used as an anti-microbial agent; for example, root extracts from D. cristata (as well as the kindred species D. arguta) has been shown efficacious in expelling intestinal parasites from certain mammals.

Notes

References
 U.S. Department of Agriculture. 2009. USDA PLANTS Profile: Dryopteris cristata
 Dryopteris cristata in Flora of North America

cristata
Flora of Europe
Flora of Asia
Flora of North America
Plants described in 1753
Taxa named by Carl Linnaeus